Laguna Escondida is a caldera in the Andes.

The area of the Central Andes and the Puna plateau are covered by thick ignimbrite sheets erupted from large volcanoes, starting from 10 mya ago probably in the northern Puna. In the southern segment of the Central Andes, major fault zones are frequently associated with the volcanic centres.

The caldera formed between 6.5 and 4 mya ago and the  Laguna Verde ignimbrite is associated with Laguna Escondida and Laguna Amarga.

References 

Miocene calderas
Calderas of Argentina